CRAJ (and Craj) may refer to :
 Commandos de Recherche et d'Action en Jungle, a French military unit based in French Guiana, according to the list of special forces units
 Centre de recherche et d'analyse juridiques, a French law research center based in the University of Pau, France
Craj - An Italian documentary film of Teresa De Sio directed by Davide Marengo